Cities of London and Westminster (also known as City of London and Westminster South from 1974 to 1997) is a constituency returning a single Member of Parliament (MP) to the House of Commons in the United Kingdom Parliament. It is a borough constituency for the purposes of election expenses and type of returning officer. As with all constituencies, the election is decided using the first past the post system of election. Since its creation at the 1950 general election, the constituency has always elected the candidate nominated by the Conservative Party.

History

Before 1950 the City of London formed a two-member constituency on its own. The Boundary Commission for England began reviewing constituencies in January 1946 using rules defined under the Representation of the People Act 1944, which excluded the City of London from the redistribution procedure; the Commission recommended that the borough of Chelsea and the City of Westminster form a single Parliamentary Borough of Chelsea and Westminster with two divisions.

In February 1948 the Government brought forward a new Representation of the People Bill which removed the right of owners of business premises to a second vote; this would have had the effect of reducing the electorate of the City of London from 12,500 to 4,600. The Bill proposed also to end the City of London as a separate constituency and to merge it with the adjacent boroughs of Finsbury and Shoreditch. During debates on the Bill, the Government amended it to substitute a link between the City of London and the City of Westminster. In introducing the amendment the Home Secretary James Chuter Ede noted that the alterations to the constituencies in Westminster, Chelsea and Kensington had been agreed unanimously at a conference between the Members of Parliament and representatives of the boroughs affected.

These changes came into force from the 1950 election.

Boundary changes
No alteration was made by the First Periodical Report on constituency boundaries in 1954. In the Second Periodical Report in 1969, the Boundary Commission wrote that their initial feelings were that "except for a minor alteration to follow a new ward boundary" they felt that there was "no reason to disturb" the constituency, and they received no objections to this proposal. Westminster City Council later suggested that the constituency could be more accurately named as 'The City of London and Westminster South'; the Boundary Commission found opinion divided and left the name unchanged when it published revised proposals for two other constituencies within the city. Subsequent representations on the name were received and the Commission decided that, although justified on historical grounds, the name was "not now entirely accurate" and so proposed the renaming as suggested by the City Council.

In initial proposals during the Third Periodical Review (1983), the Boundary Commission proposed to abolish the St Marylebone constituency and add four wards from it (Cavendish, Baker Street, Bryanston and Regents Park) to the previous City of London and Westminster South constituency; they provisionally named the result 'The City of London and Westminster'. After a local inquiry, the Regents Park ward was removed, and Hyde Park ward (from the Paddington constituency) was added; unanimous opinion at the inquiry favoured naming the result 'The City of London and Westminster South'.

For the Fourth Periodical Review (1995), the Boundary Commission paired the City of Westminster with the Royal Borough of Kensington and Chelsea for consideration. The commission's initial proposals, to expand the constituency by two wards (Bayswater and Lancaster Gate) formerly in Westminster North and to return to the name 'Cities of London and Westminster', were upheld after a local inquiry, despite multiple counter-proposals.

At the Fifth Periodical Review (in 2007), the initial proposals of the Boundary Commission paired the City of Westminster with the London Borough of Brent although they involved only minor changes to the Cities of London and Westminster constituency to take account of new ward boundaries. Widespread objections ("almost universal hostility") to the pairing led to a local inquiry, which decided that Westminster and the City of London should be reviewed separately and not paired with any other borough. The Commission proposed a new Cities of London and Westminster constituency in which the revised Bayswater and Lancaster Gate wards were removed.

Early proposals made during the initial stages of the postponed Sixth Periodic Review of Westminster constituencies proposed linking the City of London to the southern wards of Islington in a constituency to be known as "The City of London and Islington South". Most of the Westminster wards were proposed to form part of a Westminster and Kensington constituency. This proposal was the first to suggest a split between the two Cities in Parliamentary elections since they were joined and proved unpopular in consultation; the Boundary Commission revised them to return the link between the City of London and the City of Westminster, although the review was subsequently placed on hiatus.

In 2016, the Boundary Commission produced a second attempt at the Sixth Periodic Review. Its proposed Cities of London and Westminster comprises the City attached to Regent's Park and Abbey Road to the north-west, Knightsbridge/Belgravia to the west, and Holborn/Covent Garden to the north.

London Assembly constituency
Although united for Parliamentary elections, in the London Assembly, the City of London is covered by the City and East constituency, and the area in Westminster by the West Central constituency. The Local Government Commission for England argued that "combining the City of London with areas to its east could assist in focussing regeneration eastwards" and linked it with the London Borough of Tower Hamlets, the London Borough of Newham, and the London Borough of Barking and Dagenham.

Boundaries

1950–1974: From the Metropolitan Borough of Westminster: Charing Cross, Covent Garden, Great Marlborough Conduit, Grosvenor, Hamlet of Knightsbridge, Knightsbridge St. George, Pall Mall, Regent, St. Anne, St. John, St. Margaret, Strand.

In 1959, the boundaries changed, and the wards used instead were Abbey, Alderney, Aldwych, Berkeley, Cathedral, Churchill, Covent Garden, Dolphin, Eaton, Ebury, Grosvenor, Knightsbridge, Millbank, Regent Street, St. James's, Soho, Tachbrook, Victoria, Warwick and Wilton. In 1964, the City of Westminster was created to replace the old Metropolitan Borough of Westminster, which kept the same wards.

The City of London consisted of Aldersgate, Aldgate, Bassishaw, Bassishaw, Billingsgate, Bishopsgate, Bread Street, Bridge Within, Bridge Without, Broad Street, Candlewick, Castle Baynard, Cheap, Coleman Street, Cordwainer, Cornhill, Cripplegate, Dowgate, Farringdon Within, Farringdon Without, Langbourn, Lime Street, Portsoken, Queenhithe, Tower, Vintry and Walbrook.

In 1968, the City of Westminster ward boundaries changed, with the following used for this seat: Charing Cross, Churchill, Knightsbridge, Millbank, Regent Street, Victoria Street and Warwick.

1974–1983: The City of Westminster wards as above, and the City of London, as above.

New boundaries from 1978 meant the following wards from the City of Westminster were used: Baker Street, Belgrave, Bryanston, Cavendish, Churchill, Hyde Park, Knightsbridge, Millbank, St George's, St James's, Victoria, and West End.

In the City of London, Bridge Within and Bridge Without were combined in 1978 to create Bridge.

1983–1997: The City of Westminster wards as above, and the City of London as above.

1997–2010: The City of Westminster wards as above, plus, Bayswater and Lancaster Gate, and the City of London as above.

In 2002, a Local Government Boundary Commission for England review abolished the Baker Street, Belgrave, Bryanston, Cavendish, Knightsbridge, Millbank, St James's and Victoria wards.

For the 2005 general election, the Westminster electoral wards used in this constituency were Bayswater (part), Bryanston and Dorset Square (part), Churchill, Hyde Park, Knightsbridge and Belgravia, Lancaster Gate, Marylebone High Street, St James's, Tachbrook, Vincent Square, Warwick and West End.

2010–present: The City of Westminster wards of Bryanston and Dorset Square, Churchill, Hyde Park, Knightsbridge and Belgravia, Marylebone High Street, St James's, Tachbrook, Vincent Square, Warwick, and West End, and the City of London wards, as above.

The seat covers the entire City of London and most of the City of Westminster lying South of the Marylebone Road and the Westway. In the latter, more residential, city it covers Westminster, Pimlico, Victoria, Belgravia, Knightsbridge, St. James's, Soho, most of Covent Garden, alongside parts of Fitzrovia, Marylebone, Edgware Road, Paddington and Bayswater.

Constituency profile
The Cities of London and Westminster seat contains the two historical centres of the capital. The City of London is an international financial centre - while Westminster, home to the Buckingham Palace, Houses of Parliament, Whitehall and 10 Downing Street, represents Britain's political centre.

The seat includes iconic landmarks such as Buckingham Palace and St Paul's Cathedral, the West End's Theatreland and Soho. Some of the country's wealthiest residents live in exclusive Mayfair, Belgravia and Knightsbridge. Less than half the population was born in the UK - a fifth hail from elsewhere in Europe, while one in twenty is American, according to the 2011 Census.

Around half of the electorate are in the more socially mixed areas of Paddington and Pimlico, which includes some large council estates (Churchill Gardens
and Millbank Estate).

The constituency also incorporates the City of London Corporation. This includes some of the lowest populated wards in the United Kingdom, such as the Coleman Street ward, which has a total electorate of 2, and the Aldgate ward, which has a total electorate of 27.

Members of Parliament

Election results
Named Cities of London and Westminster from 1997 to date

Elections in the 2010s

Elections in the 2000s

Elections in the 1990s

Named City of London and Westminster South between 1974 and 1997

Elections in the 1980s

Elections in the 1970s 

1979 figure changes based on the October 1974 election, not the 1977 by-election.

Named from 1950 to 1974 Cities of London and Westminster

Elections in the 1960s

Elections in the 1950s

See also
List of parliamentary constituencies in London

Notes

References

External links 
nomis Constituency Profile for Cities of London and Westminster — presenting data from the ONS annual population survey and other official statistics.
Politics Resources (Election results from 1922 onwards)
Electoral Calculus (Election results from 1955 onwards)

Politics of the City of London
Politics of the City of Westminster
Parliamentary constituencies in London
Constituencies of the Parliament of the United Kingdom established in 1950